Jean-Claude Lenoir (born 27 December 1944 in Mortagne-au-Perche) was a member of the National Assembly of France between 1993 and 2012.  He represented Orne's 2nd constituency, and is a member of the Union for a Popular Movement.

References

1944 births
Living people
People from Mortagne-au-Perche
Liberal Democracy (France) politicians
Union for a Popular Movement politicians
French Senators of the Fifth Republic
Deputies of the 12th National Assembly of the French Fifth Republic
Deputies of the 13th National Assembly of the French Fifth Republic
Senators of Orne
Mayors of places in Normandy
Politicians from Normandy